Francis L. Peterson (January 23, 1904 – May 25, 1987) was a member of the Wisconsin State Assembly.

Biography
Francis Leonard Peterson was born in Colfax, Wisconsin. He was a member of the board of the local hospital and president of the council of the local church. He died in 1987.

Career
Peterson was elected to the Assembly in 1964. Previously, he was a member of the Boyceville, Wisconsin Board from 1934 to 1936 and of the Dunn County, Wisconsin Board from 1936 to 1939. He was a Republican.

References

People from Colfax, Wisconsin
County supervisors in Wisconsin
Wisconsin city council members
Republican Party members of the Wisconsin State Assembly
1904 births
1987 deaths
20th-century American politicians
People from Boyceville, Wisconsin